Ardie Suemalo Savea (born 14 October 1993) is a rugby union player who plays as a flanker or number 8 for  in the Bunnings NPC, Hurricanes in Super Rugby and international rugby for the New Zealand All Blacks. Savea was a member of New Zealand's 2019 Rugby World Cup squad and a nominee for 2019 World Rugby Player of the Year.

Savea has previously captained Wellington, and also previously played for the Barbarian F.C., for the New Zealand U20's team, and the New Zealand national rugby sevens team.

Early life

Savea was a member of the Rongotai College 1st XV, captain of the side in his final year of high school and was head prefect in his final year. Savea played as an outside centre at high school, shifting to the forwards in his professional career.

Playing career

Early career

Savea has represented New Zealand on the international sevens circuit. In the 2013 Super Rugby season he joined the Hurricanes after signing a two-year deal.

In November 2013, Savea travelled with the All Blacks to Europe, along with his older brother Julian. This was because "we want to introduce him to the way of the All Black life," said Coach Steve Hansen. Savea was the first non-playing apprentice to be selected internationally for New Zealand, with future teammates of Savea, Jordie Barrett and Atunaisa Moli, being named as apprentices in 2016 and 2017 respectively.

2015-2016

In 2015, Savea was selected for the All Blacks Sevens squad to play in the Wellington 7s series in January 2016. Savea also became a regular starter for the Hurricanes during the 2015 Super Rugby season, but missed the final due to injury. After injury to Brad Shields, Savea took over as captain of Wellington for the rest of the 2015 ITM Cup season. Savea lead Wellington to the final of the Championship division in the absence of Shields, but Wellington lost the final to Hawke's Bay's Magpies, 25-26, with a late conversion from Savea's Hurricanes teammate Ihaia West.

In 2016, after opting to withdraw from the All Blacks Sevens, Savea was selected in New Zealand's All Blacks squad for the June test series against Wales. Savea made his debut for the All Blacks, replacing Sam Cane off the bench, on 11 June, against Wales at Eden Park. Savea made a fine debut, with the All Blacks winning 39-21. The following week, Savea scored a try in his second match for New Zealand at the Westpac Stadium, his home crowd. Savea again made his way onto the field by replacing Cane off the bench. The All Blacks won, again, by 36-22.

Savea was retained in the All Blacks squad for the 2016 Rugby Championship and following an injury to Sam Cane, Savea ended up playing 2 of the Rugby Championship tests as openside flanker. In his first start for the All Blacks against South Africa in the 2016 Rugby Championship, Ardie scored a try along with his brother Julian, making them the first brothers in the All Blacks to ever do so in the same test.

Savea played 12 tests for the All Blacks in his debut season overall, 10 of them off the bench.

2017-2018

Savea was one of the highest try-scorers for the 2017 Super Rugby season, scoring six that year including a double in the Hurricanes' opening match for the year within the first ten minutes. The Hurricanes won their opening match 83-17 against the Sunwolves, with Savea playing the full 80 minutes.

Savea was selected in the 33-man squad for the 2017 Pasifika Challenge against Samoa and the three-test series against the touring British and Irish Lions. Savea started at number 8, against Samoa, because All Blacks Captain Kieran Read had not yet recovered from his broken thumb. Savea scored two tries in the 78-0 demolition of Samoa and came off the bench as a replacement in all three tests against the Lions in a drawn series. Despite performing better than starting openside flanker Sam Cane, Savea was retained as an impact player off the bench for most of the 2017 Rugby Championship. A start against Argentina in New Plymouth was the exception, with Cane replacing Savea in the 44th minute of the 39-22 win. Despite a good performance, Savea's was overshadowed by Cane and by Vaea Fifita who was Man of the Match.

With Matt Todd preferred by All Black coach Steve Hansen during tests, Savea only made two appearances on the 2017 end-of-year tour, starting in wins over the Barbarians and a French XV.

Although the 2018 Super Rugby season proved to be a mixed season for Savea, Savea performed well against France during the mid-year Steinlager series, with his performance in the first two tests including an outstanding try. Due to Sam Cane's ongoing poor discipline, Savea earned a start at openside flanker during the final test of the series, on 23 June 2018. Although the All Blacks defeated France 49-14 in the third test, winning the series 3-0, it proved Savea to be luckless, with Savea coming off injured in the 16th minute, with Matt Todd replacing Savea. Savea missed the 2018 Super Rugby playoffs due to injury.

Savea recovered from his ankle injury in time for the 2018 Rugby Championship, replacing Sam Cane off the bench in both Bledisloe Cup tests against Australia. Savea's dominance over Australia earned him a start against Argentina's Los Pumas for round 3 of the competition, on 8 September 2018. Savea lasted the full 80 minutes against Los Pumas, with the All Blacks winning 46-24, but Savea only earned 12 minutes against South Africa's Springboks the following week. Although Savea only played for 12 minutes during the All Blacks' 34-36 shock loss to South Africa, he still played well and scored a try.

Savea was released by the All Blacks for the Wellington Lions during 2018, starring in a 52-7 win over Southland during the 2018 Mitre 10 Cup. This was his first fixture for Wellington since his All Black debut.

For round 5 of the 2018 Rugby Championship, with Kieran Read being rested, Savea was scheduled to be used as impact off the bench for the All Blacks as usual, with Luke Whitelock starting at number 8 in Read's absence, on 29 September 2018. Savea, however, was drafted into the starting lineup only hours before the test against Los Pumas, with Whitelock falling ill. Savea went on to dominate his opposite number 8, Javier Ortega Desio, winning the first "Man of the Match" award of his international career. Savea lasted the full 80 minutes, with the All Blacks beating Los Pumas 35-17. Savea played outstandingly the following week, in the second test against South Africa, when he replaced the injured Sam Cane only 36 minutes into the test. Savea challenged the Springboks well as scored his seventh career try in the final minute. Savea's try was converted by first-five, Richie Mo'unga, who won the test for the All Blacks through the kick, making the final score a 32-30 win.

Savea became a regular starter for New Zealand during the 2018 end-of-year tour, with Sam Cane out injured with a fractured neck. Savea used his time as a regular starter to surpass Cane as a player, being one of few players to shine for New Zealand in a narrow 16-15 win over England, and a 9-16 loss to Ireland. Savea played in the last test of the year, starting for the All Blacks in a 66-3 victory over Italy, before coming off in the 48th minute for newcomer, Dalton Papalii. Savea finished the year as one of the best-performing New Zealanders in the opinion of many, scoring three tries during the 2018 season, making him the highest try-scorer of any All Black forward for the season.

2019
Although the Hurricanes once again failed to progress to the final in the 2019 Super Rugby season, Savea was once again influential for the team, with the likes of former All Blacks, Josh Kronfeld and Sir Michael Jones praising Savea's consistent performances. Hurricanes teammate, Beauden Barrett, also referred to Savea as the All Blacks' "most influential player".

Despite the return of Sam Cane to playing rugby, from his broken neck, Savea was retained in New Zealand's starting lineup, although at Blindside Flanker, with Liam Squire opting to withdraw from the team. Savea played in four of New Zealand's five warm-up matches prior to the World Cup in 2019 and was not subbed off for another player in any, including a 92-7 victory over Tonga.

On 28 August, All Blacks Head Coach, Steve Hansen named Savea as one of 31 players in New Zealand's squad for the 2019 Rugby World Cup.
 He played in all three pool matches, but was one of few All Blacks who could hold their head high in their 7 - 19 semi-final defeat to England, scoring New Zealand's only try in the test after intercepting a botched line-out throw from English hooker Jamie George.

Although Savea did not play in the Bronze final against Wales due to injury, he was a nominee for World Rugby Player of the Year. Savea eventually lost out on the award to South African flanker, Pieter-Steph du Toit. With Savea's older brother, Julian Savea, having been a nominee for the award in 2014 and 2015, the Savea brothers became the first set of brothers with nominations for the award.

He was also nominated for New Zealand rugby player of the year beating out Beauden Barrett and Anton Lienert-Brown for the title Savea also won Kelvin R Tremain Memorial player of the year.

List of international test tries 

Updated: 19 September 2022

Personal life
His older brother is his former Hurricanes and All Blacks teammate, Julian, who previously played as a wing for the Hurricanes. Savea is of Samoan descent and is a father-of-three, having married his partner, Saskia, in 2018.

Outside his rugby career, Savea runs a namesake clothing company, alongside his wife, and is an advocate for mental health. Savea has also recently started a podcast.

References

External links

 Ardie Savea | Rugby Database Profile
 Hurricanes profile

Living people
New Zealand rugby union players
Hurricanes (rugby union) players
Wellington rugby union players
1993 births
Rugby union flankers
Rugby union players from Wellington City
New Zealand sportspeople of Samoan descent
People educated at Rongotai College
New Zealand international rugby sevens players
Barbarian F.C. players
New Zealand international rugby union players
Rugby union number eights